Abbey is a political division returning three Councillors to the London Borough of Barking and Dagenham. At the 2018 election, Laila Butt, Darren Rodwell and Giasuddin Miah, all of the Labour Party, were elected for a four-year term in office; Rodwell is the leader of the council.

References

External links
Ward profile
Barking and Dagenham Labour Party

Wards of the London Borough of Barking and Dagenham